Hans Grieger (17 September 1941 – 1998) is a retired German football midfielder.

References

External links
 

1941 births
1998 deaths
German footballers
VfL Bochum players

Association football midfielders